Zelenogradsk (Lithuanian and Old Prussian: Krantas) is a town and the administrative center of Zelenogradsky District in Kaliningrad Oblast, Russia, located  north of Kaliningrad, on the Sambian coastline near the Curonian Spit on the Baltic Sea. Population: 

In its heyday, Zelenogradsk (as Cranz) was a popular seaside resort on Germany's eastern Baltic coast, comparable to Bognor Regis in England. However, at the end of World War II, the Soviets took over the town, and much of its tourist traffic has been diverted to nearby Svetlogorsk.

History
The site of today's Zelenogradsk was originally an Old Prussian fishing village, in the proximity of Kaup, a Prussian town on the coast of the Baltic Sea in the Viking era. The area became controlled by the Teutonic Order and settled with Germans. The German name Cranz, originally Cranzkuhren, derives from the Old Prussian word krantas, meaning "the coast". In 1454, King Casimir IV Jagiellon incorporated the region to the Kingdom of Poland upon the request of the anti-Teutonic Prussian Confederation. After the subsequent Thirteen Years' War (1454–1466), the village became a part of Poland as a fief held by the Teutonic Knights. For most of its history, it remained a small village.

From the 18th century it formed part of the Kingdom of Prussia, and from 1871 it was also part of Germany, within which it was administratively located in the province of East Prussia. During the 19th century, Cranz became the primary seaside resort for the Kingdom of Prussia on the East Prussian coastline, especially after the construction of a railway line connecting it with Königsberg (now Kaliningrad) in 1885. From 1816 to 1895, it was known as das königliche Bad, or "the royal bathing resort". In the late 19th century, the settlement was inhabited by more than 1,000 people, mainly living off tourism, however, the fishing industry remained strong. There was trade in flounder and salmon; smoked flounder was a regional delicacy. Two annual fairs were held, usually in July and August. Although Cranz had over 6,000 inhabitants by the start of World War II, it has not yet received a town charter.

The area was overrun by the Soviet Red Army during World War II and annexed to the Russian SFSR, although it suffered minimally through warfare. The German population fled during the evacuation of East Prussia or was subsequently expelled in accordance with the Potsdam Agreement. Cranz was renamed Zelenogradsk in 1946 and was granted town status in the subsequent years.

In 2015, a monument of poet Adam Mickiewicz was erected in the town to commemorate his visit in 1824.

Administrative and municipal status

Within the framework of administrative divisions, Zelenogradsk serves as the administrative center of Zelenogradsky District. As an administrative division, it is incorporated within Zelenogradsky District as the town of district significance of Zelenogradsk.

Within the framework of municipal divisions, since May 15, 2015, the territories of the town of district significance of Zelenogradsk and of four rural okrugs of Zelenogradsky District are incorporated as Zelenogradsky Urban Okrug. Before that, the town of district significance was incorporated within Zelenogradsky Municipal District as Zelenogradskoye Urban Settlement.

Tourism

The tourism industry was neglected during the Cold War and Zelenogradsk's tourism primacy was relinquished to nearby  Svetlogorsk. This policy changed in recent years. Zelenogradsk is becoming more popular with Russian vacationers, and many rich Russians own private houses in the area.

Notable people
Adolf Tortilowicz von Batocki-Friebe (1868–1944), politician
Abel Ehrlich (1915–2003), composer
Volker Lechtenbrink (1944-2021), actor
Beate Uhse-Rotermund (1919–2001), aviator and entrepreneur
Mary Saran (1897–1976), journalist 
Patrick White, a 1973 Nobel laureate, visited Cranz in the early 1930s

Twin towns and sister cities

Zelenogradsk is twinned with:
 Łeba, Poland
 Borgholm, Sweden

Former twin towns:
 Braniewo, Poland

In March 2022, the Polish city of Braniewo terminated its partnership with Zelenogradsk as a reaction to the 2022 Russian invasion of Ukraine.

References

Notes

Sources

External links

Official website of Zelenogradsk 
Zelenogradsk Business Directory 

Cities and towns in Kaliningrad Oblast
Spa towns in Russia
Beaches of Russia
Landforms of Kaliningrad Oblast
Zelenogradsky District